Henri-Auguste-Georges du Vergier (1805 – 1867) was a Legitimist member of the French National Assembly and Presidential candidate.

He was the nephew of the Vendean general Henri de la Rochejaquelein.

References

French politicians
 Cent
1805 births
1867 deaths